Leonard George Butt (26 August 1910 in Wilmslow – June 1994) was a professional footballer, who played for Stockport County, Macclesfield Town, Huddersfield Town, Blackburn Rovers, York City and Mansfield Town.

He was later manager at Mossley  and Macclesfield Town.

References

1910 births
1994 deaths
People from Wilmslow
English footballers
Association football inside forwards
English Football League players
Stockport County F.C. players
Macclesfield Town F.C. players
Huddersfield Town A.F.C. players
Blackburn Rovers F.C. players
York City F.C. players
Mansfield Town F.C. players
Huddersfield Town A.F.C. wartime guest players
Mossley A.F.C. players
Mossley A.F.C. managers
Macclesfield Town F.C. managers
Sportspeople from Cheshire
English football managers